Dorchester station could refer to:

 Dorchester station in Chicago, Illinois
 Dorchester station (PAAC) in Pittsburgh, Pennsylvania
 Dorchester South railway station in Dorchester, Dorset, England
 Dorchester West railway station in Dorchester, Dorset, England
 Dorchester station, a predecessor of Talbot Avenue station